Debile is a Latin word meaning "weak". It may refer to:
 Part of a sword in fencing; see

See also
Weak (disambiguation)